The Parliament House is the seat of the Parliament of Finland. It is located in the Finnish capital Helsinki, in the district of Töölö.

History
In 1923 a competition was held to choose a site for a new parliament house. Arkadianmäki, a hill beside what is now Mannerheimintie, was chosen as the best site.

The architectural competition which was held in 1924 was won by the firm of Borg–Sirén–Åberg with a proposal called Oratoribus (Latin for "for the speakers"). Johan Sigfrid Sirén (1889–1961), who was mainly responsible for preparing the proposal, was given the task of designing Parliament House. The building was constructed 1926–1931 and was officially inaugurated on March 7, 1931. Ever since then, and especially during the Winter War and Continuation War, it has been the scene of many key moments in the nation's political life.

Architecture and features

Sirén designed Parliament House in a stripped classical architectural style combining Neoclassicism with early twentieth century modernism. Sirén's combination of simplified columns and balusters with simplified planar geometry bears comparison to similar explorations by Erik Gunnar Asplund and Jože Plečnik. The exterior is red Kalvola granite. The façade is lined by fourteen columns with Corinthian capitals.

The building has five floors, each of which is unique. The floors are connected by a white marble staircase and famous paternoster lifts. Most important for visitors are the main lobby, the stately plenary chamber (Session Hall) and the large reception hall (State Hall).

Notable later additions to the building are the library annex completed in 1978 and a separate office block, Pikkuparlamentti, the necessity of which was an object of some controversy, completed in 2004.

Floors of the Parliament House

First floor
The first floor contains the main lobby, the Speaker's reception rooms, the newspaper room, the information service, the documents office, the messenger centre, the copying room, the restaurant, and some separate function rooms. At both ends of the lobby are marble staircases leading up to the fifth floor.

Second floor
The second floor, also known as the main floor, is centered on the plenary chamber. Its galleries have seats for the public, the press, and diplomats. Also located on this floor are the reception hall (the Hall of State), the Speaker's Corridor, the Government Corridor, the cafeteria, and adjacent function rooms.

Third floor
The third floor includes facilities for the information unit and the media, and provides direct access to the press gallery of the plenary chamber. The Minutes Office and a number of committee rooms are also located here.

Fourth floor
The fourth floor is reserved for committees. Its largest rooms are the Grand Committee room and the Finance Committee room.

Fifth floor
The fifth floor contains meeting rooms and offices for the parliamentary groups. Additional offices for the parliamentary groups are located on the sixth floor, along with additional facilities for the media.

Statues of the former presidents
Most of the statues of former presidents of the Republic of Finland have been placed in the vicinity of the Parliament House. On the lawn in front of the house are the statue of K. J. Ståhlberg from 1959 and the statue of P. E. Svinhufvud from 1961, both carved by Wäinö Aaltonen, the former on the north and the latter on the south. In the same block, in the Parliament Park immediately north of the Parliament House, there is a statue of Kyösti Kallio from 1962, carved by his son Kalervo Kallio.

Sightseeing
Guided tours are arranged on Saturdays at 11:00 and 12:30 and on Sundays at 12:00 and 13:30; in July and August also at 14:00 on weekdays. On Tuesdays and Fridays, one can watch the Parliament in session from the public balcony.

Gallery

Notes

References

External links

Parliament House brochure
Official website of the Finnish Parliament
Information about Parliament House on wcities
Short movie featuring Parliament House

Landmarks in Finland
Buildings and structures in Helsinki
Parliament of Finland
Legislative buildings in Europe
Neoclassical architecture in Finland
Seats of national legislatures
Government buildings completed in 1931
1931 establishments in Finland
Töölö